Axa was the title of a newspaper comic strip featuring the eponymous lead character, which was published in British daily tabloid The Sun from 1978 to 1986. It was created and illustrated by Romero with stories from Romero, with scripts based on these stories, written by Donne Avenell.

Publication history
Commissioned by The Sun in 1978, the series was designed as a daily three-panel adventure strip. The Sun abruptly cancelled the strip midway through a story in 1986.

Romero created 2238 strips in black/white before the comic was cancelled. The last strip published in The Sun was number 2234. It was published on November 16, 1985 (according to the Ken Pierce re-production of the Axa comic in book #9). Romero also produced a long story in full color which was published in the Spanish magazine Creepy, in issuess #52-59 (1983-1984).

Romero returned to draw his previous series, Modesty Blaise, but also took Axa to the American company Eclipse Comics, who published a two issue series of new adventures, though this time with much less nudity and Chuck Dixon as writer. Another comic book version of Axa was later produced for the Swedish comic magazine Magnum. All the strips from The Sun have been reprinted in trade paperback format by Ken Pierce Books.

In January 2011, a mobile phone game was released based on the Axa character. The game targets mainly Nokia phones, but is written in Java and is therefore expandable to other platforms.

Synopsis
Opening on a post-apocalyptic Earth in the year 2080, Axa is a woman who, having grown sick of the regimented and stifling society inside a domed city, flees into the untamed wilderness. The strip mixed elements of science fiction and sword-swinging barbarian tales. However, it is arguable that the strip's main draw were the frequent depictions of the full-figured Axa's tendency to wind up topless or fully nude, as rendered by good-girl artist Romero.

Reprints
Ken Pierce Books (US)
 The Beginning, the Chosen (1981)
 The Desired (1982)
 The Brave, The Gambler (1983)
 The Earthbound, the Tempted (1983)
 The Eager, The Carefree (1984)
 The Dwarfed, The Untamed (1984)
 The Mobile, The Unmasked (1985)
 The Castaway, the Seeker (1986)
 The Escapist, The Starstruck, The Betrayed (1988)
 Axa Color Album (1985)

References

 Axa publications in Charlie Mensuel BDoubliées

Notes

External links
 Axa
 Axa movie website
 Unizarre Film International Film & Television Productions
 Axa at Don Markstein's Toonopedia. Archived from the original on April 7, 2012.
 Axa saga at Tebeosfera, by Félix López. 

Adult comic strips
British comics titles
1978 comics debuts
Comics characters introduced in 1978
Eclipse Comics titles
Defunct British comics
Post-apocalyptic comics
British comics characters
Comics about women
Comics set in the 21st century